The Rose Fitzgerald Kennedy Bridge is an extradosed bridge over the River Barrow in Ireland. It was built as part of the N25 New Ross Bypass, and was officially opened on 29 January 2020 by Taoiseach Leo Varadkar and opened to traffic on 30 January 2020, becoming Ireland's longest bridge.

Name
The bridge is controversially officially named after Rose Fitzgerald Kennedy, the mother of former US President John F. Kennedy whose ancestors came from nearby Dunganstown.
It is also popularly referred to as the Pink Rock Bridge or as the New Ross Bypass Bridge, and as the Barrow Crossing in technical materials related to its construction.

Overview
 The  main spans of the bridge are the longest concrete-only extradosed box-girder bridge spans in the world. The spans are equal in length to the main span of the N25 Suir Bridge in Waterford; and four metres shorter the main span of the Foyle Bridge in Northern Ireland, which is 21 metres shorter in total length. The two central main spans are supported by a central plane of stay cables passing through saddles located on three towers at the three central supports. The distinctive feature of the Bridge is the different height of the towers. The side towers have a height of 16.2m and have 8 passing cables and the central pier has a height of 27.0m and 18 passing cables.

Construction method
The side spans over dry land on both sides of the river Barrow were built using a scaffold and a wing form traveller. The main spans were built using the balanced cantilever method. At its maximum length from the central pier, the west span cantilevered 140m over the river.

See also
Roads in Ireland
Atlantic Corridor
List of Ireland-related topics

References

Extradosed bridges
Extradosed bridges in Ireland
Bridges in the Republic of Ireland
Buildings and structures in County Wexford
Bridges in County Kilkenny
Cable-stayed bridges in Ireland
Bridges completed in 2019
21st-century architecture in the Republic of Ireland